St Martin's Church is an active Anglican church in Knebworth, Hertfordshire, England. The building, which is designated grade II*, was designed by Edwin Lutyens in an Italianate style. It is constructed in brick.

History
The church was built to serve the expanding settlement on the Great North Road near Knebworth railway station, over a mile from the medieval parish church St Mary and St Thomas. Before World War I there was a plan by the local landowners, the Bulwer-Lytton family, to develop Knebworth as a type of garden village. This plan was only partly realised, but it resulted in several commissions for Lutyens including a clubhouse for the local golf course and Homewood, a dower house for his mother-in-law, Edith Bulwer-Lytton, Countess of Lytton.

Construction began in 1914, but the building was not completed according to the architect's intentions. When the church was consecrated in 1915, it was in an incomplete state because of cutbacks caused by World War I. The west front was added in the 1960s and was designed by Sir Albert Richardson.  Richardson did not follow Lutyens' intention to give the church a portico, but his contribution has been described as "harmonious".

Interior
The plastered interior features limited use of Portland stone.
The aisles are separated from the nave by small arches on Tuscan columns.

Conservation
On 27 May 1968, the church was designated a grade II* listed building.

See also
 Homewood, Knebworth
 St Jude's Church, Hampstead Garden Suburb

References

External links

 Official website

Knebworth
Knebworth
Buildings and structures in North Hertfordshire District
Neoclassical architecture in Hertfordshire
Works of Edwin Lutyens in England
Knebworth
Neoclassical church buildings in England